Syarhey Yaskovich (born 14 January 1972) is a Belarusian professional football coach and former player.

His son Denis Yaskovich is also a professional footballer.

Honours
Dinamo Minsk
 Belarusian Premier League champion: 1994–95, 1995, 1997

External links
 
 
 

1972 births
Living people
Sportspeople from Pinsk
Soviet footballers
Belarusian footballers
Association football defenders
Belarus international footballers
Belarusian expatriate footballers
Russian Premier League players
Ukrainian Premier League players
Kazakhstan Premier League players
FC Dinamo Minsk players
FC Dinamo-93 Minsk players
FC Shakhtar Donetsk players
FC Anzhi Makhachkala players
Olympique Alès players
FC Tom Tomsk players
FC Moscow players
FC Aktobe players
Belarusian expatriate sportspeople in Kazakhstan
Expatriate footballers in Ukraine
Belarusian expatriate sportspeople in Ukraine
Expatriate footballers in France
Expatriate footballers in Kazakhstan
Belarusian football managers
FC Arsenal Dzerzhinsk managers
FC Bereza-2010 managers
FC Volna Pinsk managers